Elton Motello was an English punk rock and new wave band.

Elton Motello is both the moniker of Alan Ward, the lead singer and songwriter, and the name of the band itself. Alan Ward was formerly a member of the glam punk band Bastard along with Damned guitarist Brian James, Dez Lover, future Raxola frontman Yves Kengen, and Nobby Goff.

Motello then recruited a new set of musicians including Mike Butcher (aka "Jet Staxx" who had played on "Jet Boy, Jet Girl"), Willie Change (bass), and Nobby Goff (drums), to record debut album Victim of Time, which also featured guest appearances from former Pretty Things and Pink Fairies drummer John "Twink" Alder, Tony Boast, and Peter Goff (guitar).

Motello returned in 1980 with a second album, Pop Art, now backed by Butcher, Andrew Goldberg, J.P. Martins, and Walter Mets. Two singles followed towards the end of the year, after which the band split up.

"Jet Boy, Jet Girl"

Alan Ward had toured Belgium with Bastard. Through his connections there, he had his new moniker, Elton Motello, debut on the Belgian label Pinball with the single "Jet Boy, Jet Girl" in 1977. The song was backed by session musicians Mike Butcher (guitar), John Valcke (bass), and Bob Dartsch (drums), instead of Elton Motello's regular musicians. That exact same backing track was simultaneously used by Belgian artist Plastic Bertrand on his internationally successful hit single "Ça plane pour moi". Since then, "Jet Boy, Jet Girl" has sometimes been wrongly thought to be a cover of "Ça plane pour moi", with new lyrics over the same backing track, but the truth is that the two songs were simultaneous adaptations of the same backing track.

While Bertrand's single was an international hit, Motello's single in English made little impact, except in Australia, where it was released on the RCA label and hit #33 on the National Top Forty (and regionally in Melbourne at #11 and in Sydney, at #10). Also in Australia, "Jet Boy, Jet Girl" has appeared in a television commercial, but the commercial only included the chorus and none of the controversial lyrics.

Discography

Albums

Singles

After Pop Art
Alan Ward, after his time with Elton Motello, continued his musical career through producing music. He produced albums for various artists, including Plastic Bertrand, the musician behind "Ça plane pour moi", the sister song of "Jet Boy, Jet Girl". Alan Ward lives in Belgium where he works as a producer at Electric City Recording Studio.

References

English male singers
English new wave musical groups
English punk rock groups
Attic Records (Canada) artists